The discography of Good Charlotte, an American pop punk band, consists of seven studio albums, two live albums, two extended plays, 28 singles, 34 music videos and three music DVDs.

Good Charlotte released their self-titled debut album, Good Charlotte, in September 2000 with the single "Little Things", which peaked at number 23 on the Billboard Modern Rock Tracks chart. Two more singles were released from the album: "The Motivation Proclamation" and "Festival Song". Their second album The Young and the Hopeless was released in 2002. The album produced five singles: "Lifestyles of the Rich and Famous", "The Anthem", "Girls & Boys", "The Young & the Hopeless" and "Hold On". The album went on to receive a triple platinum certification from the RIAA. In October 2004, the band released their third studio album The Chronicles of Life and Death. Singles released from the album include "Predictable", "I Just Wanna Live", "The Chronicles of Life and Death" and "We Believe". Their fourth album, Good Morning Revival, was released in March 2007 and produced the singles "The River", "Keep Your Hands off My Girl" and "Dance Floor Anthem (I Don't Want to Be in Love)". Their fifth album, Cardiology, was released on November 32, 2010. "Like It's Her Birthday" was released as the first single from the album, followed by "Sex on the Radio" and "Last Night".

Albums

Studio albums

Compilation albums

Live albums

Extended plays

Singles

Notes

A. "Little Things", "Predictable", and "Like It's Her Birthday" peaked outside of the US Billboard Hot 100 chart, therefore they are listed on the Bubbling Under Hot 100 chart at number 16, 6 and 14 respectively.

Video albums

Music videos

References
Citations

Sources

 
 

Good Charlotte
Discographies of American artists
Pop punk group discographies